Erast Stepanovich Tsytovich (28 February 1830 – 27 January 1898) was an Imperial Russian military commander. By the end of his nearly five decades of service, Tsytovich attained to the rank of General of the Infantry in 1895. He took part in the 1849 Hungarian campaign, the Caucasus War (including the 1876 pacification campaign of Free Svanetia, known as Svaneti uprising of 1875–1876), and the 1877–78 Russo-Turkish War. From 1896 to his death, Tsytovich sat in the Imperial Military Council.

References 

1830 births
1898 deaths
People from Kherson Governorate
Imperial Russian Army generals
Russian military personnel of the Caucasian War
Russian military personnel of the Russo-Turkish War (1877–1878)
Burials at Nikolskoe Cemetery
Recipients of the Order of St. Anna, 2nd class
Recipients of the Order of St. Anna, 1st class